The Isle of Wight Area of Outstanding Natural Beauty is an Area of Outstanding Natural Beauty (AONB) on the Isle of Wight, England's largest offshore island.

The AONB was designated in 1963 and covers 189 square kilometres, about half of the island, mostly near the south-west and north-west coasts but also including downland in the east. It also covers about half the coastline, including both the Hamstead and Tennyson Heritage Coast areas.

The AONB is applying for UNESCO biosphere status.

See also
Western Yar

References

External links 
Isle of Wight Area of Outstanding Natural Beauty Website

Geography of the Isle of Wight
Areas of Outstanding Natural Beauty in England
1963 establishments in England
Protected areas of the Isle of Wight
Protected areas established in 1963